Shaun Phillip Williams (born December 5, 1976 in Pretoria) is a retired amateur South African freestyle wrestler, who competed in the men's featherweight category. Williams has claimed three medals (two silver and one bronze) at the All-Africa Games, picked up a bronze in the 55-kg division at the 2002 Commonwealth Games in Manchester, and later represented his nation South Africa, as a lone wrestler, at the 2004 Summer Olympics. Williams also trained for the University of Oregon's freestyle wrestling team, under his coach Pat Whidcomb, while studying and attending college in the United States.

Williams emerged himself into the international spotlight at the 2002 Commonwealth Games in Manchester, United Kingdom, where he took home the bronze medal in the men's featherweight division (55 kg). The following year, Williams continued to produce another sporting success by bringing home the African championship title in freestyle wrestling, and by ending up eleventh in the same class at the 2003 World Wrestling Championships in New York City, New York, United States, which earned him a ticket to compete for the South African Olympic team.

At the 2004 Summer Olympics in Athens, Williams qualified as a lone wrestler for the South African squad in the men's featherweight class (55 kg), by receiving a berth and rounding out the top eleven spot from the World Championships. He lost his opening bout against Bulgaria's Radoslav Velikov because of the ten-point superiority limit, and could not gain enough points to outclass China's Li Zhengyu in a sudden-death match 4–5, leaving Williams on the bottom of the prelim pool and finishing seventeenth overall in the final standings.

After his retirement from the sport in late 2007, Williams worked as the wrestling head coach for Hermiston High School in Hermiston, Oregon. In late 2015, Williams moved to Spokane, Washington, and began work for Central Valley High School in Spokane Valley, Washington, where he started a new role as a resource education teacher, in addition to his role serving as the school’s current wrestling head coach.

See also
 List of University of Oregon alumni

References

External links
Profile – International Wrestling Database

1976 births
Living people
South African male sport wrestlers
Olympic wrestlers of South Africa
Wrestlers at the 2004 Summer Olympics
Commonwealth Games bronze medallists for South Africa
Wrestlers at the 2002 Commonwealth Games
Sportspeople from Pretoria
Oregon Ducks wrestlers
University of Oregon alumni
Commonwealth Games medallists in wrestling
People from Hermiston, Oregon
African Games silver medalists for South Africa
African Games bronze medalists for South Africa
African Games medalists in wrestling
Competitors at the 1995 All-Africa Games
Competitors at the 1999 All-Africa Games
Competitors at the 2003 All-Africa Games
20th-century South African people
21st-century South African people
Medallists at the 2002 Commonwealth Games